Casually Smashed to Pieces is the fifth studio album (not including their remix album) from post-rock band The Six Parts Seven.  It was released January 23, 2007. The last song, "Everything Wrong is Right Again", is a reference to the song "Everything Right Is Wrong Again" by They Might Be Giants.

Track listing
 "Conversation Heart" – 1:15
 "Stolen Moments" – 3:32
 "Knock At My Door" – 6:07
 "Falling Over Evening" – 5:07
 "Awaiting Elemental Meltdown" – 4:21
 "Confusing Possibilities" – 7:09
 "Night Behind the Stars" - 1:15
 "Everything Wrong is Right Again" - 2:41

References

External links
SuicideSqueeze.net

Suicide Squeeze Records albums
Casually Smashed to Pieces
Casually Smashed to Pieces